Sing Sing Death House is the second studio album by the American punk rock band The Distillers, released in 2002 on Hellcat Records. The song "Seneca Falls" was featured in the game Tony Hawk's Pro Skater 4 and is a reference to the Seneca Falls Convention of 1848.

Recording and production
Sing Sing Death House was recorded in a week. Production was rushed as the band was supposed to have the album completed within two weeks. However, after their engineer disappeared during the recording sessions, the band was forced to rush the album to meet deadlines. Following its completion, Epitaph delayed its release for nine months.

Composition and lyrics
The lyrics on Sing Sing Death House are more direct than on the band's self-titled debut album. This came about due to criticism of the album's nonsensical lyrics in a review written by The Village Voice, which greatly affected Brody. Brody called the review "scathing and hilarious and life-altering", but was grateful for the review's honestly.

Critical reception
Andrew Bregman from AllMusic noted the album is "a story with an uncharacteristic ending that punks born of squalor can rise up and create music as impassioned and relatively positive as this", also calling it "authentic". In a 2003 piece called "Bands to Watch," Tim Kenneally from Spin wrote, "the band conjures the spirit of ’77 with razor-bladeriffery while [Brody] shouts about urban blight, school shootings, and her troubled youth".

Track listing
All tracks written by Brody Dalle except where noted.
"Sick of it all" – 3:10
"I am a Revenant" – 3:28
"Seneca Falls" – 3:01
"The young crazed Peeling" – 3:16
"Sing Sing Death House" – 1:43
"Bullet and the Bullseye" – 1:12
"City of Angels" – 3:29
"Young Girl" – 2:42
"Hate me" (Dalle, Mazzola) – 1:10
"Desperate" – 1:22
"I understand" – 1:47
"Lordy Lordy" – 2:19

Personnel
Brody Dalle – guitar, vocals
Casper Mazzola – guitar, vocals
Andy Outbreak – drums
Ryan Sinn – bass, vocals

Production
The Distillers – producers
Donnell Cameron – engineer
Dave Carlock – engineer
Kevin Guarnieri – engineer, mixing
Brett Gurewitz – engineer, mixing
Brody Dalle – artwork
Andy Outbreak – artwork
C.F. Martin – layout design, construction
Paul Miner – layout design, construction
Knowles Allen – photography

Charts

References

External links

The Distillers albums
2002 albums
Epitaph Records albums
Hellcat Records albums